Ethan Beckford (born 21 June 1999) is an English footballer who plays as a forward for Cavalry FC.

Born in Manchester, England into a family of former professional footballers, he joined Toronto FC in 2015 and was put into the club's Academy. He also played for Toronto FC II in 2016, before entering Pennsylvania State University the following year. He spent two years in college and represented Penn State Nittany Lions. He joined English non-league club Curzon Ashton in December 2019.

Early life
Beckford played for Richmond Hill SC, where in two seasons won the Coupe Quebec-Ontario Cup championship, secured a silver medal at the Ontario Summer Games, made the Ontario Indoor Cup finals, and claimed back to back championships in the Ontario Youth Soccer League. He joined the Toronto FC Academy in February 2016

College career
In fall of 2017, Beckford went to play college soccer at Pennsylvania State University. He played two seasons with the Nittany Lions, scoring seven goals and tallying one assist in 33 appearances. During his time with Penn State, Beckford was named to the Big Ten All Freshman team in 2017. In early 2019, Beckford opted to leave Penn State to pursue a professional career in Europe.

Club career
While in the Toronto FC academy, Beckford was called up to the Toronto FC II squad during the 2016 USL season. Beckford made his professional debut on 25 May 2016, in a 2–1 defeat to Harrisburg City Islanders. He also played with the TFC Academy in the USL League Two and League1 Ontario during 2016 and 2017.

On 2 December 2019, Beckford joined National League North side Curzon Ashton. He played a total of 16 minutes for the "Nash" in one league and one FA Trophy game. He had a trial at Port Vale in August 2020.

On 3 November 2020, Beckford signed with Northern Premier League side Hyde United. He only made a single appearance for the club.

Beckford signed with Ramsbottom United in the summer of 2021. Beckford joined North West Counties Football League Premier Division side Ashton Athletic on loan in late August 2021, going on to bag 11 goals in 13 appearances in league and cup.

In November 2021, Beckford changed clubs in the NWCFL Premier Division, joining Irlam.

In 2022, he joined Simcoe County Rovers in League1 Ontario, joining his father, who was named the team's head coach. He scored 15 goals in 17 league appearances, adding another two goals in two playoff games.

In January 2023, Canadian Premier League side Cavalry FC announced they had signed Beckford to a multi-year contract ahead of the season.

Personal life
Ethan is from a family of former professional footballers, including his father Jason Beckford, uncle Darren Beckford and cousin Danny Webber.

Career statistics

References

1999 births
Living people
Association football forwards
English footballers
Canadian soccer players
Toronto FC players
Toronto FC II players
Penn State Nittany Lions men's soccer players
Curzon Ashton F.C. players
Hyde United F.C. players
League1 Ontario players
USL Championship players
USL League Two players
National League (English football) players
Ramsbottom United F.C. players
Ashton Athletic F.C. players
Irlam F.C. players
Simcoe County Rovers FC players
English expatriate footballers
English expatriate sportspeople in Canada